Adrián Bartoš (born 12 June 1998) is a Slovak footballer who plays for OŠK Bešeňová as a defender.

Club career

Tatran Liptovský Mikuláš
Bartoš made his professional Fortuna Liga debut for Tatran Liptovský Mikuláš against Spartak Trnava on 9 August 2021.

References

External links
 MFK Tatran Liptovský Mikuláš official club profile 
 
 
 Futbalnet profile 

1998 births
Living people
Sportspeople from Ružomberok
Slovak footballers
Association football defenders
MFK Tatran Liptovský Mikuláš players
3. Liga (Slovakia) players
2. Liga (Slovakia) players
Slovak Super Liga players